King Hollow is a valley in Hickman County, Tennessee in the United States. 

King Hollow was named for a pioneer named King who settled there in 1815.

References

Landforms of Hickman County, Tennessee
Valleys of Tennessee